Loré, officially Loré Administrative Post, is an administrative post in Lautém municipality, East Timor. It was separated from Lospalos Administrative Post with effect from 1 January 2022.

References

Administrative posts of East Timor
Lautém Municipality